Fiona is a feminine given name.

Fiona may also refer to:

Animals
 Fiona (gastropod), a genus of sea slugs
 Fiona (hippopotamus), born January 2017 at the Cincinnati Zoo and Botanical Garden, Ohio, United States
Fiona pinnata, a marine mollusc, the only member of the genus Fiona and family Fionidae

Arts, entertainment, and media
 Fiona (singer) (born 1961), American rock music singer-songwriter
 Fiona (album), a 1985 album by singer Fiona
 For fictional characters named Fiona, see

See also  
 Tropical Storm Fiona, several tropical cyclones
 Hurricane Fiona, a 2022 Category 4 Atlantic hurricane